The Mayor of Havering was a position first established in 1965 with the creation of the London Borough of Havering. It replaced the mayor of Romford.

The Mayor is a councillor elected by Havering Council at a Mayor-making ceremony in May to serve for a year, during which time they act as the borough's civic and ceremonial head.

List of Mayors

References

Havering
London Borough of Havering